This article lists the winners and nominees for the Black Reel Award for Outstanding Breakthrough Performance, Male. Prior to 2014 the category was no gender specific, thus was called Outstanding Breakthrough Performance. Derek Luke was the first recipient (male or female) to win the Outstanding Breakthrough Performance category. Luke was also the first performer to win a Black Reel Awards in a Lead or Supporting performance and the Breakthrough performance in the same year. 

Currently, Daniel Kaluuya is the only male actor to win the BRA "Triple Crown" acting award with wins in the Lead, Supporting and Breakthrough categories. Kaluuya took home the award for Outstanding Actor & Outstanding Breakthrough Performance, Male for Get Out and won the award for Outstanding Supporting Actor for Judas and the Black Messiah.   

At age 14, Abraham Attah became the youngest actress to win this award for Beasts of No Nation and at age 34, Kingsley Ben-Adir became the oldest winner in this category for One Night in Miami....

Winners and nominees
Winners are listed first and highlighted in bold.

2000s

2010s

2020s

Multiple nominations from the same film
 Tyler James Williams (winner) and Brandon P. Bell in Dear White People (2015)
 Andre Holland and  Stephan James in  Selma (2015)
  Jason Mitchell and O'Shea Jackson Jr. in  Straight Outta Compton (2016)
 Trevante Rhodes (winner), Alex Hibbert, and Ashton Sanders in Moonlight (2017)
 Daniel Kaluuya (winner) and Lil Rel Howery in Get Out (2018)
 Jonathan Majors and Jimmie Fails in The Last Black Man in San Francisco (2020)
 Kingsley Ben-Adir (winner) and Eli Goree in One Night in Miami... (2021)
 Deon Cole & Edi Gathegi in The Harder They Fall (2022)

Age superlatives

References

Black Reel Awards